The fishing industry includes any industry or activity concerned with taking, culturing, processing, preserving, storing, transporting, marketing or selling fish or fish products. It is defined by the Food and Agriculture Organization as including recreational, subsistence and commercial fishing, and the related harvesting, processing, and marketing sectors. The commercial activity is aimed at the delivery of fish and other seafood products for human consumption or as input factors in other industrial processes. The livelihood of over 500 million people in developing countries depends directly or indirectly on fisheries and aquaculture.

The fishing industry is struggling with environmental and welfare issues, including overfishing and occupational safety. Additionally, the combined pressures of climate change, biodiversity loss and overfishing endanger the livelihoods and food security of a substantial portion of the global population.

Sectors

There are three principal industry sectors according to the Food and Agriculture Organization as including recreational, subsistence and commercial fishing.

Other slightly different definitions exist, for example the Australian government uses:
 
 The commercial sector: comprises enterprises and individuals associated with wild-catch or aquaculture resources and the various transformations of those resources into products for sale. It is also referred to as the "seafood industry", although non-food items such as pearls are included among its products.
 The traditional sector: comprises enterprises and individuals associated with fisheries resources from which aboriginal people derive products in accordance with their traditions.
 The recreational sector: comprises enterprises and individuals associated for the purpose of recreation, sport or sustenance with fisheries resources from which products are derived that are not for sale.

Traditional

Recreational

Commercial sector

World production 

Fish are harvested by commercial fishing and aquaculture.

According to the Food and Agriculture Organization (FAO), the world harvest in 2005 consisted of  captured by commercial fishing in wild fisheries, plus  produced by fish farms. The number of individual fish caught in the wild has been estimated at 0.97–2.7 trillion per year (not counting fish farms or marine invertebrates).

Following is a table of the 2011 world fishing industry harvest in tonnes (metric tons) by capture and by aquaculture.

Related industries 
Once fish is caught, especially in commercial sectors, bringing the fish to consumers require a complex series of related industries.

Fish farming

Aquaculture is the cultivation of aquatic organisms. Unlike fishing, aquaculture, also known as aquafarming, is the cultivation of aquatic populations under controlled conditions. Mariculture refers to aquaculture practiced in marine environments. Particular kinds of aquaculture include algaculture (the production of kelp/seaweed and other algae); fish farming; shrimp farming, shellfish farming, and the growing of cultured pearls.

Fish farming involves raising fish commercially in tanks or enclosed pools, usually for food. Fish species raised by fish farms include carp, salmon, tilapia, catfish and cod. Increasing demands on wild fisheries by commercial fishing operations have caused widespread overfishing. Fish farming offers an alternative solution to the increasing market demand for fish and fish protein.

Fish processing

Fish processing is the processing of fish delivered by commercial fisheries and fish farms. The larger fish processing companies have their own fishing fleets and independent fisheries. The products of the industry are usually sold wholesale to grocery chains or to intermediaries.

Fish processing can be subdivided into two categories: fish handling (the initial processing of raw fish) and fish products manufacturing. Aspects of fish processing occur on fishing vessels, fish processing vessels, and at fish processing plants.

Another natural subdivision is into primary processing involved in the filleting and freezing of fresh fish for onward distribution to fresh fish retail and catering outlets, and the secondary processing that produces chilled, frozen and canned products for the retail and catering trades.

Fish products

Fisheries are estimated to currently provide 16% of the world population's protein. The flesh of many fish are primarily valued as a source of food; there are many edible species of fish. Other marine life taken as food includes shellfish, crustaceans, sea cucumber, jellyfish and roe.

Fish and other marine life can also be used for many other uses:  pearls and mother-of-pearl, sharkskin and rayskin. Sea horses, star fish, sea urchins and sea cucumber are used in traditional Chinese medicine. Tyrian purple is a pigment made from marine snails, and sepia is a pigment made from the inky secretions of cuttlefish. Fish glue has long been valued for its use in all manner of products. Isinglass is used for the clarification of wine and beer. Fish emulsion is a fertilizer emulsion that is produced from the fluid remains of fish processed for fish oil and fish meal.

Fish derived protein hydrolysates have been identified to exhibit a wide range of bioactivities making them important to food and health care industries. Hydrolysates derived from fish processing by-products like swim bladder, skin, scale, bones and fins display blood pressure regulatory, anti-inflammatory, neuroprotective, immunomodulatory and anti-cancer activity. Fish hydrolysates are also on the rise for commercial purposes in food industries due to their lipid peroxidation inhibition, high emulsification activity and large water retention capacity making them effective food matrix stabilization and shelf life enhancement agents.

In the industry, the term seafood products is often used instead of fish products.

Fish marketing

Fish markets are marketplace used for the trade in and sale of fish and other seafood. They can be dedicated to wholesale trade between fishermen and fish merchants, or to the sale of seafood to individual consumers, or to both. Retail fish markets, a type of wet market, often sell street food as well.

Most shrimp are sold frozen and are marketed in different categories. The live food fish trade is a global system that links fishing communities with markets.

Environmental impact

Sustainable fishery

International disputes

The ocean covers 71% of the earth's surface and 80% of the value of exploited marine resources are attributed to the fishing industry. The fishing industry has provoked various international disputes as wild fish capture rose to a peak about the end of the 20th century, and has since started a gradual decline. Iceland, Japan, and Portugal are the greatest consumers of seafood per capita in the world.

Disputes in the Americas
Chile and Peru are countries with high fish consumption, and therefore had troubles regarding their fish industries. In 1947, Chile and Peru first adopted the 200 nautical mile standard as their exclusive economic zone (EEZ), and in 1982, the UN formally adopted this term. In the 2000s, Chile and Peru suffered a serious fish crisis because of excessive fishing and lack of proper regulations, and now . From the late 1950s, offshore bottom trawlers began exploiting the deeper part, leading to a large catch increase and a strong decline in the underlying biomass. The stock collapsed to extremely low levels in the early 1990s and this is a well-known example of non-excludable, non-rivalrous public good in economics, causing free-rider problems.

Following the collapse of the Atlantic northwest cod fishery in 1992, a dispute arose between Canada and the European Union over the right to fish Greenland halibut (also known as turbot) just outside of Canada's exclusive economic zone in the Grand Banks of Newfoundland. The dispute became known as the Turbot War. On 9 March 1995, in response to observations of foreign vessels fishing illegally in Canadian waters and using illegal equipment outside of Canada's EEZ, Canadian officials boarded and seized the Spanish trawler Estai in international waters on the Grand Banks. Throughout March, the Spanish Navy deployed patrol ships to protect fishing boats in the area, and Canadian forces were authorized to open fire on any Spanish vessel showing its guns. Canada and the European Union reached a settlement on 15 April which led to significant reforms in international fishing agreements.

Disputes in Europe
Iceland is one of the largest consumers in the world and in 1972, a dispute occurred between UK and Iceland because of Iceland's announcement of an Exclusive Economic Zone (EEZ) to reduce overfishing. This dispute is called the Cod Wars, direct confrontations between Icelandic patrol vessels and British warships.

Nowadays in Europe in general, countries are searching for a way to recover their fishing industries. Overfishing of EU fisheries is costing 3.2 billion euros a year and 100,000 jobs according to a report. So Europe is constantly looking for some collective actions that could be taken to prevent overfishing.

Disputes in Asia
Japan, China and Korea are some of the greatest consumers of fish, and have some disputes over Exclusive Economic Zone.
In 2011, due to a serious earthquake, the nuclear power facility in Fukushima was damaged. Ever since, huge amount of contaminated water leaked and is entering the oceans. Tokyo Electric Power Company (Tepco) admitted that around 300 tonnes of highly radioactive water had leaked from a storage tank on the site. In the Kuroshio Current, the sea near Fukushima, about 11 countries catch fish. Not only the surrounding countries such as Japan, Korea and China, but also the countries like Ukraine, Spain and Russia have boats in the Kuroshio Current. In September 2013, South Korea banned all fish imports from eight Japanese prefectures, due to the radioactive water leaks from the Fukushima nuclear plant.

The North_Pacific_Anadromous_Fish_Commission: NPFC was established in 2015 to manage fish stocks against increasing demand.
Members are Canada, Japan, Russia, the United States, and South Korea. China, Taiwan, and Vanuatu also participated in the meeting.
The NPFC imposes catch limits on member countries and countries participating in the conference. A crackdown on　　Illegal,_unreported_and_unregulated_fishing(IUU) vendors was also requested.

Society and culture

Global goals 
International policy to attempt to address these issues is captured in Sustainable Development Goal 14 ("Life below water") and its Target 14.4 on "Sustainable fishing": "By 2020, effectively regulate harvesting and end overfishing, illegal, unreported and unregulated fishing and destructive fishing practices and implement science-based management plans, in order to restore fish stocks in the shortest time feasible, at least to levels that can produce maximum sustainable yield as determined by their biological characteristics".

Standards and labelling 
The Marine Stewardship Council (MSC) is an independent non-profit organization which sets a standard for sustainable fishing. Fisheries that wish to demonstrate they are well-managed and sustainable compared to the MSC's standards are assessed by a team of experts or Conformity Assessment Bodies (CABs) who are independent of both the fishery and the MSC.

By country

See also

Fishery
Fishing industry by country
Fishing industry in the Caribbean
Sustainable fishing

References

External links
 FAO Fisheries Information
  NOAA Fisheries Service

 
Industries (economics)